Heidenau is a railway station in the town of Heidenau, Saxony, Germany. The station lies on the Děčín–Dresden-Neustadt railway and Müglitz Valley Railway and the train services are operated by DB Regio Südost (most as Dresden S-Bahn services).

Train services
The station is served by the following service(s):
2x per day regional service (Wanderexpress Bohemica, summer weekends only) Dresden - Pirna - Bad Schandau - Děčín - Ústí nad Labem - Litoměřice
1x per hour regional service (Müglitztalbahn) Heidenau - Glashütte - Altenberg
2x per day regional service (Wintersport Express, winter weekends only) Dresden - Heidenau - Glashütte - Altenberg
2x per hour S-Bahn S1 Meißen Triebischtal - Dresden - Pirna - Bad Schandau - Schöna
2x per hour S-Bahn S2 Dresden Flughafen - Dresden - Pirna

References

External links
 
Network map
Städtebahn Sachsen website
Heidenau station at www.verkerhsmittelvergleich.de 

Railway stations in Saxony
Dresden S-Bahn stations
station